Schloßsee is a lake in the Vorpommern-Greifswald district in Mecklenburg-Vorpommern, Germany. At an elevation of -0.5 m, its surface area is 0.1 km2.

Lakes of Mecklenburg-Western Pomerania